Idnea concolorana is a species of snout moth in the genus Idnea. It was described by Francis Walker in 1863, and is from Brazil.

References

Moths described in 1863
Chrysauginae